Rop is a surname of Kenyan origin that may refer to:

Julius Kiptum Rop (born 1977), Kenyan marathon runner
Rodgers Rop (born 1976), Kenyan marathon runner and winner of the 2002 Boston and New York marathons

See also
Kiprop, related name meaning "son of Rop"
Rops (disambiguation)

Kalenjin names